Omega Arcane is the fourth studio album by the Finnish metal band Shade Empire. It was released 6 May 2013 by Candlelight Records.

Track listing 
 "Ruins" – 8:03
 "Dawnless Days" – 5:23
 "Until No Life Breeds" – 4:42
 "Ash Statues" – 5:00
 "Disembodiment" – 12:59
 "Malicious Winds" – 5:20
 "Traveler of Unlight" – 4:47
 "Devolution" – 2:38
 "Slumbering Giant" – 6:29
 "Nomad" – 6:46
 "Omega Arcane" – 12:13

Personnel 
Band members
 Juha Harju – vocals
 Janne Niiranen – guitars
 Juha Sirkkiä – guitars
 Olli Savolainen – synthesizer
 Eero Mantere – bass guitar
 Erno Räsänen – drums

Additional credits
 Petra Lisitsin – female vocals

References 
 Official website
 Omega Arcane at Encyclopaedia Metallum

2013 albums
Shade Empire albums